Dietz Bluff is a prominent bluff at the head of Hilton Inlet on the Black Coast, Palmer Land. The bluff was photographed from the air by the United States Antarctic Service, 1940, and by the Ronne Antarctic Research Expedition, 1947. It was mapped by the United States Geological Survey from U.S. Navy aerial photographs taken 1966–69, and named by the Advisory Committee on Antarctic Names, in association with the names of continental drift scientists grouped in this area, after Robert S. Dietz, an American marine geologist with the Atlantic Oceanographic and Meteorological Laboratory, Miami, Florida, from 1967.

References 

Cliffs of Palmer Land